ESO 510-G13 is a spiral galaxy approximately 150 million light-years away in the constellation Hydra. The equatorial dust cloud is heavily warped; this may indicate that ESO 510-G13 has interacted with another galaxy. If this is the case, it would provide an excellent illustration of the distortion caused by interacting galaxies, discussed in the article Galaxy formation and evolution under the Spiral galaxy heading.

This galaxy was examined by the Hubble Space Telescope in 2001.

See also
 Antennae Galaxies
 Centaurus A

References

External links

 HST: Warped Galaxy
 SIMBAD: ESO 510-13 -- Galaxy
 

510-G13
Hydra (constellation)
-04-33-013
Peculiar galaxies
49473
Spiral galaxies